Minuscule 617 (in the Gregory-Aland numbering), O 13 (von Soden), is a Greek minuscule manuscript of the New Testament, on parchment. Palaeographically it has been assigned to the 11th century. The manuscript is lacunose. Tischendorf labeled it by 140a, 215p, and 74r.

Description 

The codex contains the text of the New Testament except Gospels on 164 parchment leaves (size ), with two large lacunae (Acts 1:8-19:12; Galatians 2:21-1 Timothy 4:10). The lacking texts were supplemented by two hands on paper in the 13th century. The text is written in two columns per page, 31 lines per page.

It contains Prolegomena, some notes to the Acts, and numerous notes to the Pauline and Catholic epistles.
It has Euthalian Apparatus, but incomplete. The text of Epistles is surrounded by a catena, the Apocalypse has a commentary.

It contains treatise of Pseudo-Dorotheus on the Seventy disciples and twelve apostles (as codices 82, 93, 177, 459, 614, 699).

The order of books: Acts of the Apostles, Pauline epistles, Catholic epistles, and Book of Revelation. Hebrews is placed after Epistle to Philemon.

Text 

Kurt Aland did not place the Greek text of the codex in any Category.

History 

The manuscript belonged to the metropolitan of Ephesus Neophytus in 1481. It was bought for the library in "Gallicio" in 1624.

The manuscript was added to the list of New Testament manuscripts by Johann Martin Augustin Scholz. Gregory saw the manuscript in 1886. The text of the Apocalypse was collated by Herman C. Hoskier.

Formerly it was labeled by 140a, 215p, and 74r. In 1908 Gregory gave the number 617 to it.

The manuscript currently is housed at the Biblioteca Marciana (Gr. Z. 546 (786)), at Venice.

See also 

 List of New Testament minuscules
 Biblical manuscript
 Textual criticism

References

Further reading 

 Herman C. Hoskier, Concerning the Text of the Apocalypse: Collation of All Existing Available Greek Documents with the Standard Text of Stephen’s Third Edition Together with the Testimony of Versions, Commentaries and Fathers. 1 vol. (London: Bernard Quaritch, Ltd., 1929), pp. 238–239.

Greek New Testament minuscules
11th-century biblical manuscripts